General elections were held in Saint Vincent and the Grenadines on 22 August 1966. Although the Saint Vincent Labour Party received the most votes, the People's Political Party won a majority of seats. Voter turnout was 84.1%.

Results

By constituency

References

Saint Vincent
Elections in Saint Vincent and the Grenadines
1966 in Saint Vincent and the Grenadines